Jos North is a local government area in Plateau State, Nigeria. Its headquarters are in the city center of Jos.The postal code of the area is 930.

It has an area of 291 km and a population of 729,300 at the 2006 census. The ethnic groups found in this area include: Hausa, Anaguta, Bache Irigwe and Berom.

References

Local Government Areas in Plateau State